The 2020 Toronto Argonauts season was scheduled to be the 63rd season for the team in the Canadian Football League and their 148th year of existence. This would have been the first full season with Michael Clemons as general manager following his appointment mid-way through the 2019 season. This would have also been the first season for head coach Ryan Dinwiddie.

Training camps, pre-season games, and regular season games were initially postponed due to the COVID-19 pandemic in Toronto. The CFL announced on April 7, 2020 that the start of the 2020 season would not occur before July 2020. On May 20, 2020, it was announced that the league would likely not begin regular season play prior to September 2020. On August 17, 2020 however, the season was officially cancelled due to COVID-19.

Offseason

Personnel changes
Following the end of a disappointing season for first-year head coach, Corey Chamblin, new general manager, Michael Clemons, stated that Chamblin's position would undergo a thorough review. Over a month later, on December 12, 2019, it was announced that Chamblin would be relieved of his coaching duties and Ryan Dinwiddie would be named the team's new head coach, the 45th in team history.

CFL National Draft
The 2020 CFL National Draft took place on April 30, 2020. The Argonauts held the second selection in each round of the draft by virtue of finishing second to last in the 2019 league standings, less any traded picks. They obtained another first-round pick and gained a third-round pick after trading Zach Collaros and a fifth-round pick to the Winnipeg Blue Bombers. To acquire Collaros, the Argonauts traded their fourth-round pick to the Saskatchewan Roughriders. The team swapped a third-round pick for a fifth-round pick with the Montreal Alouettes that saw the club acquire Ryan Bomben. The Argonauts traded a seventh-round pick and Martese Jackson to Edmonton in exchange for a third-round pick in the 2019 CFL Draft. The team also traded an eighth-round selection to Montreal in exchange for Boseko Lokombo.

The team also gained a territorial selection for the second consecutive year after finishing in the bottom two of the previous year's standings.

CFL Global Draft
The 2020 CFL Global Draft was scheduled to take place on April 16, 2020. However, due to the COVID-19 pandemic, this draft and its accompanying combine were postponed to occur just before the start of training camp, which was ultimately cancelled. The Argonauts were scheduled to select second in each round with the number of rounds never announced.

Planned schedule

Preseason
For the third consecutive season, the Argonauts were scheduled to play their home pre-season game at a U Sports football stadium.

Regular season 
The Argonauts were scheduled to be the home team for a neutral site game for the Week 7 match-up with the Saskatchewan Roughriders. The league had been contemplating returning to Moncton, having been there in the previous season, but it was officially announced on January 23, 2020 that a Touchdown Atlantic game would be played in Halifax at Huskies Stadium. However, due to the COVID-19 pandemic, it was announced on May 20, 2020 that the game was cancelled.

Team

Roster

Coaching staff

References

External links
 

Toronto Argonauts seasons
2020 Canadian Football League season by team
2020 in Canadian football
2020 in Toronto